The Tiger Woods Learning Center or TGR Learning Lab is an educational facility established in 2006 by the golfer Tiger Woods in Anaheim, California.

The learning center is used by several thousand students, with a day program for grades 4-6 and an after schools program for grades 7-12. It has a summer program, weekend and community outreach programs and online learning programs. It has multimedia facilities and an outdoor golf teaching area. It offers courses on careers in math, science, technology and language arts.

It is housed in a 35,000 square foot (3,300 m²) facility opened in February 2006. Former President Bill Clinton and the First Lady of California Maria Shriver were at the opening ceremony in 2006.

In February 2021, the TGR Learning Lab surpassed two million students reached through its programs.

School Day 
The TGR Learning Lab is a different type of learning experience for students. Learning is done outside of textbooks and offers a hands-on, interactive style.

Forensic science classes learn real-world techniques including fingerprinting, DNA analysis and chromatography

Marine biology classes practice dissections, analyze different samples and learn about marine-life classifications.

Expanded Learning 
The TGR Learning Lab strives to foster a growth mindset in every student they serve. Encouraging students to challenge themselves, building strong relationships and building self-confidence are their top priority. 

The Lab also focuses on connecting school and career, making sure students are prepared for their futures. Students are able to take classes in over 50 areas of study within STEM related fields. They are able to recognize potential and identify interests from a variety of fields. The Lab also provides over 30 college access and financial aid workshops each year.

These expanded learning opportunities have satellite programs in Washington D.C., South Florida, Philadelphia, New York, MCB Quantico and the flagship location in Southern California.

College Access 
The TGR Learning Lab's college-access program provides workshops, group sessions and presentations on a wide range of topics designed to help all students, especially low-income and first-generation students, plan a roadmap to college.

Their college recruitment events bring dozens of universities to the TGR Learning Lab, allowing students to meet face-to-face with college representatives.

Other resources include:

 Engagement with parents to teach them how to advocate for their child’s educational success
 Scholarships sending TGR Learning Lab students to experience real university life for a portion of their summer
 ACT and SAT Preparation courses

Golf Program 
The golf program at the TGR Learning Lab is designed to promote golf to underserved youth, provide golf-course access, and expose kids to careers in the golf industry.

Students gain an understanding of the biomechanical motions of golf swings and kinesthetic movements during a swing, as well as course-management strategies to lower scores. 

Working with top-notch instructors, students build self-confidence while learning the game in a safe, supportive environment. Golf programs are offered year-round for students of all skill levels.

The main goal of the golf program is not just to teach students about the game, but to build etiquette and respect through the game as well. 

The Player Development Program builds honesty, integrity, and sportsmanship while honing golf knowledge and skills. Student golfers progress through three levels of the program: Level 1-Tour Class, Level 2-Players Class, and Level 3-Masters Class. Each level contains progressive milestones for students to reach.

Over 31,343 students have been introduced to the game of golf through the program.

References

External links
 Official site (archive)
 TGR Learning Lab profile on TGR Foundation website

Educational institutions in the United States
Education in Anaheim, California
Education in Orange County, California
Tiger Woods